The Mistik Reserve is an Indian reserve of the Peter Ballantyne Cree Nation in Saskatchewan.

References

Indian reserves in Saskatchewan
Division No. 18, Saskatchewan
Peter Ballantyne Cree Nation